

Galicia

Top scorers

Asturias
The top team was promoted to Segunda División.

Castile and León
The top team was promoted to Segunda División.

Top scorers

Cantabria
As Gimnástica de Torrelavega resigned to promotion, CD Monte was promoted to Segunda División as runner-up.

Top scorers

Basque Country

Top scorers

Navarre
The top team was promoted to Segunda División.

La Rioja 
There was not any promotion to Segunda División.

Top scorers

Aragon
The top team was promoted to Segunda División.

Territorial 1

Territorial 2

Catalonia
The top team was promoted to Segunda División.

Top scorers

Balearic Islands
The top team was promoted to Segunda División.

Top scorers

Valencian Community
The top team was promoted to Segunda División.

Top scorers

Region of Murcia
The top team was promoted to Segunda División.

Top scorers

Andalusia
The top team was promoted to Segunda División.

Almería

Top scorers

Cádiz

Top scorers

Córdoba

Top scorers

Granada

Top scorers

Huelva

Top scorers

Jaén
Football-7

Top scorers

Málaga

Top scorers

Sevilla

Top scorers

Extremadura
The top team was promoted to Segunda División.

Group 1

Top scorers

Group 2

Top scorers

Promotion

Top scorer: Irene Martínez (Santa Teresa CD B), Lidia Santos and Sheila Fernández (EF Peña El Valle): 3 goals

Castile-La Mancha
The top team was promoted to Segunda División.

Top scorers

Community of Madrid
The top team was promoted to Segunda División.

Top scorers

Ceuta 
Fútbol-8

See also
Ligas Regionales (Spanish women's football)

References

3
Ligas Regionales (Spanish women's football)
Seasons in Spanish women's football competitions